The Fighting Prince of Donegal is a 1966 adventure film starring Peter McEnery and Susan Hampshire, based on the novel Red Hugh: Prince of Donegal by Robert T. Reilly. It was released by the Buena Vista Distribution Company.

Plot
Set in the late 1580s, the film very loosely follows the real-life exploits of the 16th-century Irish prince Hugh Roe "Red Hugh" O'Donnell. The story begins when Hugh's father, the Chief of the Name, dies, leaving his son as Chief of Clan O'Donnell. With his accession to the throne, an Irish prophecy is seemingly fulfilled which promises independence from Elizabethan and English rule. In response, the Queen's Lord Lieutenant abducts him and imprisons him in Dublin Castle as a hostage for the Clan's good behavior. After a daring escape, he flies across Ireland with the sons of Hugh Roe O'Neill.

The O'Donnell lords see this occurrence as the opportunity to strike back at the foreigners by force, but Hugh convinces them the right plan is to band together with the other clans of the island, and bargain for their freedom from a position of strength. As he prepares for battle, O'Donnell also courts the beautiful Kathleen McSweeney, to further augment the clans of Ireland.

Cast
Peter McEnery as Hugh O'Donnell
Susan Hampshire as Kathleen McSweeney
Andrew Keir as Lord McSweeney
Tom Adams as Henry O'Neill
Gordon Jackson as Captain Leeds
Norman Wooland as Sir John Perrott
Richard Leech as Phelim O'Toole
Peter Jeffrey as Sergeant
Marie Kean as Lady Ineen O'Donnell 
Bill Owen as Officer Powell
Maurice Roëves as Martin
Donal McCann as Sean O'Toole

Reception
Critical reception was split on Fighting Prince between those who thought it clichéd and oversimplified (Variety and Time) and those who accepted it as unpretentious fun (the New York Herald Tribune and The New York Times).

The film did not do well at the box office.

Comic book adaption
 Gold Key: Walt Disney Presents The Fighting Prince of Donegal (January 1967)

Home Media
The Fighting Prince Of Donegal was released on DVD as a Disney Movie Club Exclusive on February 13, 2007. The DVD is now out-of-print. As of March 5, 2023, it has yet to be released on Blu-Ray.

See also
 List of American films of 1966
 Hugh Roe O'Donnell
 Nine Years' War (Ireland)

References

External links
 
 
 
 

1966 films
1966 drama films
1960s adventure drama films
1960s English-language films
1960s historical adventure films
American adventure drama films
American biographical films
American historical adventure films
British adventure drama films
British biographical films
British historical adventure films
County Donegal in fiction
Films adapted into comics
Films based on American novels
Films produced by Walt Disney
Films scored by George Bruns
Films shot at Pinewood Studios
Films set in Ireland
Films set in the 1580s
Walt Disney Pictures films
Films directed by Michael O'Herlihy
1966 directorial debut films
1960s American films
1960s British films